Nick Gregson (born 17 December 1995) is a professional rugby league footballer who plays as a second row forward for the Swinton Lions in the Betfred Championship.

In October 2017 he left the Wigan Warriors to play for the Leigh Centurions in the Betfred Championship from the 2018 season. He also spent two loan spells at Oldham RLFC (Heritage № 1401).

References

External links
Leigh Centurions profile
Wigan Warriors profile

1995 births
Living people
English rugby league players
Leigh Leopards players
Oldham R.L.F.C. players
Preston Grasshoppers R.F.C. players
Rugby league second-rows
Swinton Lions players
Wigan Warriors players
Workington Town players